Sunless Days is Beseech's 5th album, released in 2005 by Napalm Records.

Track listing
 "Innerlane"
 "The Outpost"
 "A Bittersweet Tragedy"
 "Everytime I Die"
 "Devil's Plaything (Danzig cover)"
 "Lost"
 "Last Obsession"
 "Emotional Decay"
 "Restless Dreams"
 "The Reversed Mind"

Digipak bonus tracks
 "Manmade Dreams (2005)"
 "Lost (Emotional Version)"

Personnel
 Erik Molarin - Vocals
 Lotta Höglin - Vocals
 Robert Vintervind - Guitar
 Manne Engström - Guitar
 Daniel Elofsson - Bass
 Jonas Strömberg - Drums
 Mikael Back - Keyboards

2005 albums
Beseech albums
Napalm Records albums